Thomas James Smith (1827−1896) was the founder of Smith & Nephew, one of the United Kingdom's largest medical devices businesses.

Career
After training as a pharmacist at a dispensing chemist in Grantham and then at University College, London, Thomas Smith opened his own chemist's shop in Hull in 1856. In 1858 he started selling cod-liver oil most of which came from Newfoundland although he obtained one large batch at a cheaper price from Norway: he sold these supplies to hospitals on a wholesale basis.

In 1896 he was joined by his nephew, Horatio Nelson Smith, who helped build T.J. Smith & Nephew into a global medical supplies business. Thomas Smith died later in 1896.

Family
Smith, who never married, had no children.

Other interests
He became President of the Hull Chamber of Commerce.

References

1827 births
1896 deaths
19th-century British businesspeople